Shinas College of Technology (ShCT) in Oman was founded in September 2005 and is one of the seven Colleges of Technology (CoTs) under the operation and directives of the Ministry of Manpower (MoMP).  The campus is located at Al–Aqur, on the northern outskirts of Wilayat of Shinas in the Governorate of North Batinah region,  about 69 km from the city of Sohar.

The College is managed by the College Dean and the College Council with Assistant Deans and Heads of Academic Departments and Centers as members.

ShCT is a public institution catering to higher educational needs of all Omani youths by offering General Foundation Program (GFP) and Post Foundation specialization programs in Business, Engineering and Information Technology.  The GFP includes English, Basic Maths and IT.  The different levels under the Post Foundation programs include Diploma, Advanced Diploma, and Bachelor.

Study programs
By September 2006, the college started offering certificate programs in Engineering and IT with a student population of about 194 students. By September 2007, the college extended its program to Diplomas in Electrical Power, Computer and Mechanical Engineering and Diploma in IT. During the same period, the College began to offer the certificate course in Business. A year later, all the programs were extended to Advanced Diploma levels in Engineering, IT, and Business.  In the summer of 2011, Civil engineering as an additional specialization was included in the curriculum.  During the Academic Year (AY) 2013-14 the college began to offer bachelor programs in the faculty of Engineering, IT and Business.

The College has four academic departments: English Language Centre (Responsible for all English language courses under GFP and Post Foundation Level Programs), Engineering, Information Technology (Responsible for offering Maths and IT courses under GFP) and Business Studies.  Engineering, IT and Business departments are responsible for Post Foundation Level Programs.

Enrollment
, about 2303 students are pursuing Post Foundation programs and 813 students are in GFP while, 127 students enrolled in the On-The-Job (OJT) program. There are 395 staff serving under academic and administrative departments, centers and units.

References

Colleges in Oman
2005 establishments in Oman
Educational institutions established in 2005